Nevin Robert Ashley (born August 14, 1984) is an American former professional baseball catcher. He played in Major League Baseball (MLB) for the Milwaukee Brewers. He was a bullpen catcher with the Toronto Blue Jays from 2020 to 2021.

Career

Tampa Bay Rays
Prior to playing professionally, he attended North Knox High School in Bicknell, Indiana and then Indiana State University. He was drafted in the sixth round of the 2006 amateur draft by the Tampa Bay Devil Rays and began his professional career that year. With the Princeton Devil Rays in 2006, Ashley hit .333 with four home runs and 28 RBI in 47 games. The following year, with the Columbus Catfish, he hit .280 with 12 home runs, 60 RBI and 20 stolen bases - all career highs. In 2008, Ashley hit .235 with four home runs and 26 RBI in 102 games with the Vero Beach Devil Rays. He split 2009 between the Charlotte Stone Crabs and Montgomery Biscuits, hitting a combined .230 with three home runs and 36 RBI. In 2010, he hit .249 with eight home runs and 47 RBI with the Biscuits and Durham Bulls. In 2011, he hit .263/.358/.384 with 8 HR and 48 RBI between Montgomery and Durham. In 2012, Ashley hit .271/.379/.458 with 6 HR and 18 RBI between Durham and the GCL Rays. Ashley elected free agency on November 2, 2012.

Cincinnati Reds/Pittsburgh Pirates
On November 22, 2012 Ashley signed a minor league deal with the Cincinnati Reds. He spent the entire 2013 season with the Louisville Bats, he finished batting .235 in 80 games with 6 home runs and 28 RBIs. On November 5, 2013, he became a free agent.

Ashley signed with the Pittsburgh Pirates on November 26, 2013. He spent the entire 2014 season with the Indianapolis Indians he finished batting .246 in 70 games with two home runs and 24 RBIs. On November 4, 2014, he became a free agent.

Milwaukee Brewers
Ashley signed a minor league contract with the Milwaukee Brewers on January 5, 2015 with an invite to spring training. He was promoted to their major league roster on September 7, 2015. Two days later he made his debut against the Miami Marlins, hitting a two-out, RBI double off pitcher Tom Koehler in the top of the second inning in his first major league at-bat. The Brewers lost the game, 5-2. On October 7, 2015, he was designated for assignment by the Brewers, and Ashley subsequently elected free agency on October 14 after being outrighted to the Colorado Springs Sky Sox.

Ashley appeared in 12 games with the Brewers, batting .100 with one double and one RBI. In the minors with the Sky Sox he hit .306 with 14 doubles, eight home runs and 61 RBIs in 94 games.

New York Mets
On January 15, 2016, Ashley signed a minor league deal with the New York Mets.

Texas Rangers
On August 31, 2016, the Mets traded Ashley to the Texas Rangers for cash.

Seattle Mariners
On January 26, 2017, Ashley signed a minor league deal with the Seattle Mariners.  He was assigned to the Tacoma Rainers on April 7, 2017. He elected free agency on November 6, 2017.

Toronto Blue Jays
In February 2019, Ashley joined the Blue Jays as a bullpen catcher.

Personal life
Ashley and his wife, Ashley, have two sons, Gaige and Aiden.

References

External links

1984 births
Living people
American expatriate baseball people in Canada
People from Vincennes, Indiana
Baseball players from Indiana
Major League Baseball catchers
Milwaukee Brewers players
Indiana State Sycamores baseball players
Princeton Devil Rays players
Columbus Catfish players
Vero Beach Devil Rays players
Charlotte Stone Crabs players
Montgomery Biscuits players
Phoenix Desert Dogs players
Durham Bulls players
Gigantes del Cibao players
Gulf Coast Rays players
Louisville Bats players
Indianapolis Indians players
Colorado Springs Sky Sox players
Toros del Este players
American expatriate baseball players in the Dominican Republic
Las Vegas 51s players
Round Rock Express players
Eau Claire Express players